Nuclear Electric Insurance Limited (NEIL) is a mutual insurance company which insures all nuclear power plants in the United States as well as some facilities internationally. The company is based in Wilmington, Delaware, and is registered in Bermuda.

It was founded in 1980 in response to the 1979 Three Mile Island accident. In 1997 NEIL merged with Nuclear Mutual Limited, of Bermuda.

The company provides a range of insurance products, including property damage coverage, third-party liability coverage, and environmental impairment liability coverage.

See also
 Oil Insurance Limited—mutual insurance company serving the energy industry

References

External links
 

Financial services companies established in 1980
Mutual insurance companies of the United States
Nuclear power in the United States
Companies based in Wilmington, Delaware
Non-renewable resource companies established in 1980
1980 establishments in Delaware